is a Nippon Professional Baseball pitcher for the Fukuoka SoftBank Hawks in Japan's Pacific League.

External links

Living people
1973 births
Baseball people from Osaka Prefecture
Japanese baseball players
Nippon Professional Baseball pitchers
Fukuoka Daiei Hawks players
Fukuoka SoftBank Hawks players
People from Kanan, Osaka